Bald–hairy is a common joke in Russian political discourse, referring to the empirical rule of the state leaders' succession defined as a change of a bald or balding leader to a hairy one and vice versa. This consistent pattern can be traced back to as early as 1825, when Nicholas I succeeded his late brother Alexander as the Russian Emperor. Nicholas I's son Alexander II formed the first "bald–hairy" pair of the sequence with his father.

In Soviet times (for rulers after Lenin), the rule applies to the General (First) Secretaries of the Central Committee. In relation to the Chairmen of the All-Russian Central Executive Committee the rule is not followed. Additionally, the Chairmen of the Presidium of the Supreme Soviet of the USSR do not follow the rule, having more 'hairy' leaders than 'bald'.

The current "bald–hairy" pair of Russian rulers are the balding Vladimir Putin and Dmitry Medvedev, who has a full head of hair. Putin was the president from 2000 until 2008; Medvedev held the post until 2012, whereupon Putin became president again.

Pattern
The bald–hairy joke is that there is, apparently, a strict rule applying to Russia's politics for the latest two centuries. A bald (or obviously balding) state leader is succeeded by a non-bald ("hairy") one, and vice versa. While this pattern is most likely a coincidence, it has held true since 1825, starting from Nicholas I (with the possible exception of Georgy Malenkov, who was Premier of the Soviet Union from 1953 to 1955, but not First Secretary and at no point an uncontested leader). However, some newsreel film of Joseph Stalin at the Potsdam Conference showed that he was in the early stages of balding, lending controversy to the rule.

Some time after the death of hairy Stalin, the actual leader of the USSR was the head of government, Georgy Malenkov, who was also hairy and did not fit into the pattern. However, in the first months after the death of Stalin and before arrest, the greatest power was held by Minister of Internal Affairs Lavrenty Beria, who was bald.

Additionally, on the 5th of November 1996 Viktor Chernomyrdin was temporarily appointed as the official head of state while Yeltsin was undergoing a difficult surgery. He may be counted as being preceded and followed by Yeltsin, and was bald. A similar situation was that of Gennady Yanaev: during the August coup, he actually headed the USSR for 3 days as the Acting President. He was hairy, and his predecessor and successor Gorbachev was bald. 

Thus, the only exception to the rule was Alexander Rutskoy. During the constitutional crisis in 1993, as a "hairy", he countered, "hairy" Yeltsin.

Usage 
The pattern is believed to have become well known during the period of Leonid Brezhnev's leadership. In the middle of the 1990s some humorously predicted that bald Gennady Zyuganov would "inevitably" win the 1996 presidential election and thus replace non-bald Boris Yeltsin. In modern Russia the pattern is a frequent subject for jokes and cartoons. It is often used in political journalism:

Other patterns in Russian rulers' successions

Man–woman 
From 1682 to 1801 there was a strict "man–woman" sequence on the Russian throne: Peter I the Great, Catherine I, Peter II, Anna, Ivan VI, Elizabeth, Peter III, Catherine II the Great, Paul. Emperor Paul changed the rules of succession to the throne so that only men could rule the country, and the "man–woman" interchange was terminated. If Tsarina Sophia (a sister of Peter I and Ivan V and a powerful regent during their minority), is counted as a de facto ruler, then the sequence could be traced from 1676, when another of Sophia's brothers, Feodor III, succeeded to the throne.

Killed–died 
A different sequence is related to the character of death of the Russian monarchs and can be traced from 1730 to 1825 and separately from 1825 to 1917: Anna died, Ivan VI was killed, Elizabeth died, Peter III was killed, Catherine the Great died, Paul was killed, Alexander I died. After an interruption of the sequence, when Nicholas I suppressed the revolt of Decembrists who threatened to kill him and his family, the sequence resumed when Nicholas I's son Alexander II was killed, Alexander III died, and Nicholas II was killed. However, Nicholas's designated successor Michael II was never confirmed as Emperor, and soon after the Russian Revolution of 1917, was executed by revolutionaries.

Bald and hairy prime ministers 
A similar pattern has been observed among the prime ministers since 1999: "Hairy" Sergei Stepashin, "bald" Vladimir Putin, "hairy" Mikhail Kasyanov, "bald" Mikhail Fradkov, "hairy" Viktor Zubkov, "bald" Vladimir Putin, "hairy" Dmitry Medvedev, "bald" Mikhail Mishustin. This pattern is valid only if acting prime ministers are excluded.

See also
 Curse of Tippecanoe
 Redskins Rule
 List of leaders of Russia
 Volodymyr Ivanovych Savchenko, to whom this theory is sometimes attributed
 British prime ministers with facial hair

Sources

References

Nicholas I of Russia
Alexander II of Russia
Adages
Russian humour
Political history of Russia
Human hair